Bob Vylan are an English duo based in London who play a style merging elements of grime, punk rock and hip hop.

History
The band was formed in 2017 by singer/guitarist Bobby Vylan and drummer Bobbie Vylan. The first concert followed just two weeks later.

In the first year of the band's history, Bob Vylan released four singles and an EP via the band's own label, Ghost Theatre. Following the DIY principle, the musicians personally delivered their albums to various record stores.

On August 7, 2020, the band released their debut album, We Live Here. Bob Vylan then toured supporting the Offspring and Biffy Clyro and performed at the Reading and Leeds Festivals in 2021. 

On April 22, 2022, the band released their second studio album, Bob Vylan Presents the Price of Life, which entered the UK Albums Chart at number 18.

Musical style
Bob Vylan combine grime rap with punk rock. Singer Bobby Vylan grew up listening to rap, grime, punk and indie rock. After learning the guitar, he wanted to incorporate all of his influences into his music. The lyrics deal with social and political issues such as racism, police violence, unequal income distribution, access to healthy food gentrification, the influence of Hollywood on the working class and the influence of prescribed medicine on the population. The American magazine Alternative Press recommended Bob Vylan for fans of Idles, Fever 333 and Turnstile.
Ian Winwood from UK magazine Kerrang! called Bob Vylan the most exciting and important punk band in the United Kingdom in 2022.

Awards

|-
! scope="row" | 2022
| Best Alternative Music Act
| MOBO Awards
| 
| This is the first year the MOBO Awards has had Best Alternative Music Act as a category
| 
|-
! scope="row" | 2022
| Best Album
| Kerrang! Awards
| 
| For the album Bob Vylan Presents the Price of Life
|

References

External links 
 
 Charts: UK

Black British musical groups
English punk rock groups
English hip hop groups
Grime music groups
Male musical duos
2017 establishments in England
Musical groups established in 2017
Musical groups from London